Short-track speed skating at the 2007 Asian Winter Games was held at the Changchun Wuhuan Gymnasium in Changchun, China. Events were held from 29 January to 31 January 2007.

Schedule

Medalists

Men

Women

Medal table

Participating nations
A total of 60 athletes from 8 nations competed in short track speed skating at the 2007 Asian Winter Games:

References
 2007 Winter Asiad sports schedule

 
2007 Asian Winter Games events
Asian Winter Games
2007
International speed skating competitions hosted by China